Pearl's Hill City Park is a 9 hectares city park in Singapore built around a reservoir on top of Pearl's Hill. It is located behind Outram Park MRT station.

See also
List of Parks in Singapore
National Parks Board

References
National Parks Board, Singapore
National Parks Board, Singapore - Pearl's Hill City Park

External links
National Parks Board, Singapore - Pearl's Hill City Park

Parks in Singapore